Howrah - Rajendra Nagar Express is an Express train of the Indian Railways connecting Howrah Junction in West Bengal and Rajendra Nagar Terminal of Bihar. It is currently being operated with 12351/12352 train numbers on a daily basis.
Modern LHB coach with a MPS of 160 kmph are more comfortable. The new coaches, based on a German technology Linke Hoffman Busch, are made of stainless steel which do not turn turtle during accidents; the light-weight coaches will improve the train's speed. Bigger windows, lamps at all AC seats and sound insulation are the other facilities of this train.Howrah - Rajendra Nagar Express runs with 1 AC 1 tier coach, 2 AC 2 tier coaches,7 AC 3 tier coaches, 6 Sleeper coaches, 5 General coaches along with 2 EOG coaches. Thus, having a total of 22 LHB coach; the normal locomotive of Howrah - Rajendra Nagar Express is a WAP-7 locomotive of Gomoh/Samastipur shed. Loco in-charge for this train is WAP-7 Gomoh/Samastipur Shed.Before that it was hauled by WAP-7 Howrah Shed.Earlier was hauled by a WAP-4 Howrah Shed. Earlier It was used to run till Danapur in Patna, but it had been then terminated at Rajendra Nagar Terminal in Patna.Punctual and clean also; this along with Howrah Janshatabdi,Shalimar Duronto,Patna Garib Rath are trains from/to Patna-Kolkata.

Service

The 12351/Howrah - Rajendra Nagar Patna Express has an average speed of 55 km/hr and covers 529 km in 9 hrs 40 mins. 12352/Rajendra Nagar Patna - Howrah Express has an average speed of 56 km/hr and 529 km in 9 hrs 250 mins.

Route and halts 

The important halts of the train are:

Background 
The train has two dedicated LHB rakes. Howrah - Rajendra Nagar Express ,Howrah–Patna Jan Shatabdi Express are two dedicated intercity trains between Howrah (HWH) and Patna.

Development 
On 14 October 2020, replacing the old ICF coaches, Howrah - Rajendra Nagar Express got new German LHB rakes. Modern LHB coach are more comfortable and at the same time faster than the conventional ICF coaches.

Coach composite

The train has standard LHB rakes with max speed of 130 kmph. The train consists of 22 coaches :

 1 AC First-class
 2 AC II Tier
 5 AC III Tier
 10 Sleeper Coaches
 2 General
 2 Second-class Luggage/parcel van

Traction

It is regularly hauled by a Samastipur-based WAP-7,Gomoh-based WAP-7locomotive from end to end.

Coach composition 
Coach composition are as follows(for 12352)-

And for 12351 it is the reverse.

See also 

 Rajendra Nagar Terminal railway station
 Howrah Junction railway station

Notes

External links 

 12351/Howrah - Rajendra Nagar Patna Express
 12352/Rajendra Nagar Patna - Howrah Express

References 

Transport in Patna
Rail transport in Howrah
Express trains in India
Rail transport in Bihar
Rail transport in West Bengal
Rail transport in Jharkhand
Railway services introduced in 2010